Priobskoye is a rural locality (a selo) and the administrative center of Priobsky Selsoviet of Bystroistoksky District, Altai Krai, Russia. The population was 782 as of 2016. There are 11 streets.

Geography 
Priobskoye is located south from the Ob River, 7 km southeast of Bystry Istok (the district's administrative centre) by road. Bystry Istok is the nearest rural locality.

Ethnicity 
The village is inhabited by Russians and others.

References 

Rural localities in Bystroistoksky District